I've Always Loved You is a 1946 American drama musical film produced and directed by Frank Borzage and written by Borden Chase. The film stars Philip Dorn, Catherine McLeod, William Carter, Maria Ouspenskaya, Felix Bressart and Elizabeth Patterson. Rare for a film produced by Republic Pictures, I've Always Loved You is a high-budget prestige production with an A-list director in Borzage.

Plot
The film was based on Chase's story Concerto, which in turn was based on the career of his first wife. It was originally called Concerto and was the most expensive film ever made by Republic Pictures.

Cast
Philip Dorn as Leopold Goronoff
Catherine McLeod as Myra Hassman
Bill Carter as George Sampter
Maria Ouspenskaya as Madame Goronoff
Felix Bressart as Frederick Hassman
Elizabeth Patterson as Mrs. Sompter
Vanessa Brown as Georgette 'Porgy' Sampter at 17
Lewis Howard as Michael Severin
Adele Mara as Señorita Fortaleza
Gloria Donovan as Porgy at 5
Stephanie Bachelor as Redhead
Cora Witherspoon as Edwina Blythe
Fritz Feld as Nicholas Kavlun

Radio adaptation
I've Always Loved You was presented on Lux Radio Theatre November 4, 1946. Joseph Cotten and Catherine McLeod starred in the adaptation.

Restoration
A new restoration of I've Always Loved You by Paramount Pictures, The Film Foundation, and Martin Scorsese screened at the Museum of Modern Art (MoMA) on February 10, 2018 as part of the museum's program of showcasing 30 restored films from the library of Republic Pictures curated by Scorsese.

References

External links
 
 
 
 
 

1946 films
1946 drama films
1940s musical drama films
1946 musical films
American musical drama films
Films about classical music and musicians
Films about pianos and pianists
Films directed by Frank Borzage
Films produced by Frank Borzage
Republic Pictures films
1940s English-language films
1940s American films